Madraset El Moshaghbeen (English: School of the Rowdies) is a popular Egyptian comedy play written by Ali Salem and directed by Galal El Sharkawy. It is a loose retelling of To Sir with Love. It starred a cast of newcomers like Adel Emam, Saeed Saleh, Younes Shalaby, Ahmad Zaki, and Hasan Mustafa.

Overview 
Unlike the original film, which is a drama dealing with racial and social issues in an inner city school, the Egyptian remake is primarily a comedy about five most notoriously bad students in the country who keep failing and retaking their last year of high school whose previous teachers were all led to mental breakdowns due to their pranks.

Madraset el-Moshaghbeen starred a cast of relatively new actors at the time, but due to its major success in Egypt and the Middle East it led the actors into stardom. Adel Imam was praised for his comedy and kicked started his career as one of the most popular comedic actors in the Middle East. Ahmad Zaki was highly praised for his role as Ahmed" and later did more serious roles in film.

Plot 
The story takes place in a school that consists of five rebellious students grouped together in one class, who have failed, for over a decade, to graduate school. The principal decides to hire a new female teacher, thinking that she can improve the behavior of these students. Effat, the new female teacher, takes on the task, meeting with little initial success. The plot concerns the back and forth between the students and their teacher's attempts at working with them.

Legacy 
The play is considered a classic, and is an Eid favourite. It was released on Netflix in 2020. In 2021, after decades in black and white, the play began streaming in colour, after sponsoring by the Saudi General Entertainment Authority.

Cast
Suhair El-Babili as Effat 
Adel Emam as Bahgat El Abasery
Saeed Saleh as Morsi El Zanaty
Younes Shalabi as Mansour
Hadi El-Gayyar as Lotfy
Ahmad Zaki as Ahmad
Hassan Moustafa as Abdel Moati the Principal
Nazeem Sha'rawi as Bahgat's father
Abd Allah Farghali as Allam El Mallawanny
Samir Waly El Din as Jaber

See also 
 Rubabikia
 El Eyal Kebret

References

Egyptian plays
1973 plays